Anatole "Tolly" de Grunwald (25 December 1910 – 13 January 1967) was a Russian British film producer and screenwriter.

Biography 

De Grunwald was born in Saint Petersburg, Russia, the son of a diplomat (Constantin de Grunwald) in the service of Tsar Nicholas II of Russia. He was seven years old when his father was forced to flee with his family to France during the 1917 Bolshevik Revolution. He grew up in France and England, studied at Gonville and Caius College, Cambridge, where he edited a student magazine, The Europa, and attended the University of Paris (Sorbonne). He started his career in films by reading scripts for Gaumont-British. He then turned to screenwriting in 1939 for the British film industry and eventually became a producer.

He was appointed managing director of Two Cities Films, and later formed his own production company with his brother, Dimitri de Grunwald in 1946. De Grunwald contributed to the scripts of many of his productions, including The Winslow Boy (1948) and The Holly and the Ivy (1952). Most of his films were British productions, although in the 1960s, invited by MGM, he went to the United States where he produced several films, then returned to England for the remainder of his career. Anatole de Grunwald's final films included The V.I.P.s (1963) and The Yellow Rolls-Royce (1965). He worked in close collaboration with the director Anthony Asquith and the dramatist Terence Rattigan, with whom he made many films.

Anatole de Grunwald died in London.

Filmography

 Pygmalion— 1938 (uncredited screenwriter)
 Discoveries — 1938 (screenwriter)
 French Without Tears – 1939 (as co-screenwriter with Terence Rattigan, who was uncredited)
 Spy for a Day — 1940 (screenwriter)
 Major Barbara — 1941 (screenwriter)
 Pimpernel Smith — 1941 (screenwriter)
 Quiet Wedding – 1941 (as co-screenwriter with Rattigan)
 Jeannie — 1941 (screenwriter)
 Cottage to Let   (aka Bombsight Stolen) — 1941 (screenwriter)
 Freedom Radio  - 1941 (screenwriter)
 Penn of Pennsylvania — 1942 (screenwriter)
 The Day Will Dawn — 1942 (screenwriter)
 Unpublished Story — 1942 (screenwriter)
 The First of the Few – 1942 (as screenwriter) (in the USA known as  "Spitfire")
 Secret Mission — 1942 (screenwriter)
 Tomorrow We Live  (aka At Dawn We Die  ) - 1943 (screenwriter)
 They Met in the Dark — 1943 (screenwriter)
 The Demi-Paradise – 1943
 English Without Tears — 1944 (produced and co-screenwriter)
 The Way to the Stars – 1945  
 While the Sun Shines —1947
 Bond Street — 1948
 The Winslow Boy – 1948 (also as screenwriter)
 Now Barabbas — 1949 (screenwriter)
 The Last Days of Dolwyn — 1949
 Golden Arrow — 1949
 The Queen of Spades – 1949
 Flesh and Blood — 1951
 Home at Seven — 1952 (screenwriter)
 Treasure Hunt — 1952
 The Holly and the Ivy  – 1952
 Twilight Women — 1952 (screenplay)
 Innocents in Paris — 1953
 The Doctor's Dilemma – 1958
 Libel – 1959 (also as screenwriter)
 Come Fly with Me – 1962
 I Thank a Fool – 1962
 The V.I.P.s – 1963
 The Yellow Rolls-Royce – 1964
 Stranger in the House'' – 1967

External links

1910 births
1967 deaths
British film producers
British male screenwriters
Emigrants from the Russian Empire to the United Kingdom
University of Paris alumni
Alumni of Gonville and Caius College, Cambridge
20th-century British screenwriters
20th-century British businesspeople
Expatriates from the Russian Empire in France